Australian Trade Union Archives is a website intended to be an online resource for archived and present day material related to industrial organisations in Australia.

It went online in 2002.

It is a joint project of the Australian Science and Technology Heritage Centre of the University of Melbourne, the Noel Butlin Archives Centre of the Australian National University, the School of Information Management and Systems at Monash University, and the archives of the University of Wollongong.

References

External links
 Australian Trade Union Archives

Trade unions in Australia
Online archives of Australia
Internet properties established in 2002